Edit Miklós (born 31 March 1988) is a Hungarian-Romanian former World Cup alpine ski racer, a specialist in the speed events of Downhill and Super-G. Since 2002, she has trained in Austria.

Career
Born in Miercurea Ciuc, Romania, into an ethnic Hungarian family, Miklós began skiing at age five. By the age of 12, she participated in World Cup races for children, and made her World Cup debut in December 2005 at age 17.

She got injured just before the 2006 Winter Olympics thus she had to miss the Games, while in Vancouver in 2010 she fell in the downhill and suffered injuries that kept her away from skiing for three months. The following year, Miklós finished 18th in both the downhill and super-G at the 2009 World Championships in Val d'Isère. She achieved her best World Cup result a few weeks later, 26th in a super-G at St. Moritz.

Until 2010, Miklós competed for Romania, but after she obtained the Hungarian citizenship and the relation between her and the Romanian Ski Federation broke down, she opted to race for Hungary. The Romanians did not want to let her go, but pursuant to the rules of the International Ski Federation  (FIS), if a skier changes her citizenship according to her nationality, it is the sole discretion of the FIS to decide whether they give the race permit or not. The Hungarian Ski Association started to lobby to allow Miklós to compete for Hungary, which resulted the FIS finally giving its permission on 17 January 2011.

By changing nationalities, Miklós lost all her FIS points prior to the 2011 World Championships in Germany.

Fact is, FRSB never really understood its role and scope and constantly faulted her competing career.

In her first Winter Olympics for Hungary in 2014, Miklós finished 16th in the super combined and 7th in the downhill, achieving the country's best result in any Olympic alpine race, beating all skiers from Austria, the most successful nation in alpine skiing at the Olympics. The result also made her the top Hungarian sportswoman at the Games. She set a new personal best in World Cup competition with a fifth place in a downhill at Crans-Montana in 2014. She gained her first World Cup podium, also Hungary's first, with a third-place finish in a downhill at St. Moritz in January 2015.

World Cup results

Season standings

Standings through 4 February 2018

Results per discipline

Race podiums

 2 podiums – (2 DH)

World Championship results

Olympic results

After retirement

In 12 April 2018 Miklós announced her retirement in a press conference. Three days later, on 15 April 2018 she was elected the president of the Hungarian Ski Association.

References

External links
 
 
 Edit Miklos World Cup standings at the International Ski Federation
 
 
 
 Head Skis – athletes – Edit Miklós
 

1988 births
Living people
Sportspeople from Miercurea Ciuc
Székely people
Hungarian female alpine skiers
Romanian female alpine skiers
Olympic alpine skiers of Romania
Alpine skiers at the 2010 Winter Olympics
Alpine skiers at the 2014 Winter Olympics
Olympic alpine skiers of Hungary